The 2011–12 season was the Cornish Pirates 9th season in the second tier of the English rugby union league system, the RFU Championship and their third in the British and Irish Cup. The Pirates finished 3rd in Stage One of the Championship, allowing them to qualify for the promotion stages, where they were losing finalist to London Welsh RFC. They also reached the semi–finals of the British and Irish Cup losing to Cross Keys in Wales.

Pre–season Friendlies

RFU Championship

Stage One matches
Stage one is a league programme of 22 matches starting on Saturday, 3 September 2011 and completed by Saturday, 25 February 2012. Each team play 11 matches at home and 11 away. Top eight teams play in the promotion play–offs, bottom four play in the relegation play–off.

24 September H v Leed Carnegie televised on Sky Sports

Stage One final table

Stage Two matches
Stage Two: The promotion play–offs are played in two groups of four with the top two teams qualifying for the knock–out stages. The relegation play–offs consist of one group of four teams with the bottom team being relegated. Each team plays three matches at home and three away. The top two teams in each group qualify for the semi–finals.

Group B table (Promotion) 

* Adj – refers to number of points awarded before the start of the play-offs.

Points per match are awarded as follows:
 Four points for a win
 Two points for a draw
 1 bonus point for scoring four tries and/or losing a match by seven points or less
 Knock-out stages consist of two-legged semi–finals and final with the highest league finisher from Stage One being the home team

Semi–final

Final

British and Irish Cup
The Cornish Pirates were drawn in Pool one and played the teams in Pool two. The Pool winners and the two best runners–up qualified for the  Quarter–finals.

Pool one fixtures

Pool one final table

Quarter–final

Semi–final

Squad 2011–12

Dual Registration
 Tom Cowan–Dickie (Exeter Chiefs)
 David Ewers (Exeter Chiefs)
 Lloyd Fairbrother (Exeter Chiefs)
 Sam Hill (Exeter Chiefs)
 Drew Locke (Exeter Chiefs)
 Alan Paver (Exeter Chiefs)
 Charles Walker–Blair (Exeter Chiefs)

Internationally Capped Players
Andrew Suniula joined the Pirates after the 2011 World Cup.

Transfers 2011–12

Players In
 Tom Cooper (from  Newport Gwent Dragons)
 David Doherty (from  Jersey)
 Tom Kessell (from  Plymouth Albion)
 Ben Maidment (from  Moseley)
 Matt Smith (from  UWIC
 Ryan Westren (from  Launceston) moved to London Scottish in December 2011
 Andrew Suniula (from  Chicago Griffins)
 Darren Daniel (from  Carmarthen Quins) 
 Ceiron Thomas (from  Leeds Carnegie)
 Matt Evans (from  Newport Gwent Dragons)

Players Out
 Sam Betty (to  Worcester Warriors)
 Blair Cowan (to  Worcester Warriors in January 2012)
 James Currie (to  Worcester Warriors)
 Ben Gulliver (to  Worcester Warriors)
 Tyrone Holmes (released)
 Matt Hopper (to  Harlequins) 
 Nick Jackson (released)
 Tom Luke (released)
 Steve Winn (released)

Coaching staff
 Chris Stirling (High Performance Manager) appointed in January 2009 and left club in April 2012.
 Ian Davies (Head Coach) from April 2012. Previously Forwards Coach appointed in April 2009.
 Harvey Biljon (Backs Coach) appointed in April 2009.
 Simon Raynes (Strength and Conditioning Coach) since summer 2005.

See also

2011–12 RFU Championship
2011-12 British and Irish Cup

References

External links
Cornish Pirates
Cornish Pirates unofficial fans site
Cornish Rugby

Cornish Pirates seasons
Cornish Pirates
Cornish Pirates